Jack Allan Abramoff (born February 28, 1959) is an American lobbyist, businessman, film producer, writer, and convicted felon. He was at the center of an extensive corruption investigation led by Earl Devaney that resulted in his conviction and 21 other people either pleading guilty or being found guilty, including White House officials J. Steven Griles and David Safavian, U.S. Representative Bob Ney, and nine other lobbyists and congressional aides.

Abramoff was College Republican National Committee National Chairman from 1981 to 1985, a founding member of the International Freedom Foundation, allegedly financed by apartheid South Africa, and served on the board of directors of the National Center for Public Policy Research, a conservative think tank. From 1994 to 2001 he was a top lobbyist for the firm of Preston Gates & Ellis, and then for Greenberg Traurig until March 2004.

After a guilty plea in the Jack Abramoff Native American lobbying scandal and his dealings with SunCruz Casinos in January 2006, he was sentenced to six years in federal prison for mail fraud, conspiracy to bribe public officials, and tax evasion. He served 43 months before being released on December 3, 2010. After his release from prison, he wrote the autobiographical book Capitol Punishment: The Hard Truth About Washington Corruption From America's Most Notorious Lobbyist which was published in November 2011.

Abramoff's lobbying and the surrounding scandals and investigation are the subject of two 2010 films: the documentary Casino Jack and the United States of Money, released in May 2010, and the feature film Casino Jack, released on December 17, 2010, starring Kevin Spacey as Abramoff.

Early life
Jack Abramoff was born February 28, 1959, in Atlantic City, New Jersey. His parents were Jane (née Divac) and Franklin Abramoff, who was president of the Franchises unit of Diners Club credit card company.

Abramoff's family moved to Beverly Hills, California, when he was ten (in 1969). After seeing the film version of Fiddler on the Roof at age twelve, Abramoff decided to practice Orthodox Judaism. In California, Abramoff attended Beverly Hills High School. In high school, he played football and became a weight-lifting champion. Pulitzer prize-winning food critic Jonathan Gold, who was the same year at Beverly Hills High as Abramoff, recounted to the Jewish Journal a time when Abramoff pushed him and his cello down a flight of stairs.

College and law school years
As an undergraduate at Brandeis University, Abramoff served as Chairman of the Massachusetts Alliance of College Republicans, which organized student volunteers for Ronald Reagan's 1980 presidential campaign. He graduated with a B.A. in English in 1981. He earned his Juris Doctor from the Georgetown University Law Center in 1986.

According to Nina Easton, Abramoff gained much of his credibility in the conservative movement through his father, Franklin Abramoff. As president of Diners Club International, Abramoff's father worked closely with Alfred S. Bloomingdale, a personal friend of Reagan.

College Republican National Chairman
After graduating from Brandeis, Abramoff ran for election as chairman of the College Republican National Committee (CRNC). After a campaign which cost over $11,000 and was managed by Grover Norquist, Abramoff won the election. His chief competitor, Amy Moritz was persuaded to drop out. (Later, as Amy Ridenour, she became a founding director of the National Center for Public Policy Research. She was treated to several trips funded by Jack Abramoff when he was working as a lobbyist.) Abramoff "changed the direction of the [college] committee and made it more activist and conservative than ever before", notes the CRNC. "It is not our job to seek peaceful coexistence with the Left", Abramoff was quoted as saying in the group's 1983 annual report. "Our job is to remove them from power permanently."

Norquist served as executive director of the committee under Abramoff. He later recruited Ralph Reed, a former president of the University of Georgia College Republicans chapter, as an unpaid intern. According to Reed's book Active Faith, Reed introduced Abramoff to Pamela Clarke Alexander, and they later married.

As chair of the CRNC, Abramoff addressed the 1984 Republican National Convention in Dallas, Texas.

Long-standing college political alliances
At the CRNC, Abramoff developed political alliances with College Republican chapter presidents across the nation. Many would later hold key roles in state and national politics and business, and some would later interact with Abramoff in his role as a lobbyist. Some of those relationships were at the core of the federal investigation.

At the CRNC, Abramoff, Norquist and Reed formed what was known as the "Abramoff-Norquist-Reed triumvirate". After Abramoff's election, the trio purged "dissidents" and re-wrote the CRNC's bylaws to consolidate their control over the organization.  According to Easton's Gang of Five, Reed was the "hatchet man" and "carried out Abramoff-Norquist orders with ruthless efficiency, not bothering to hide his fingerprints".

In 1983, the CRNC passed a resolution condemning "deliberate planted propaganda by the KGB and Soviet proxy forces" against the government of South Africa, at a time when the country's government was under worldwide criticism for its apartheid regime.

In 1984, Abramoff and other College Republicans formed the "USA Foundation", a non-partisan tax-exempt organization which held two days of rallies on college campuses around the United States celebrating the first anniversary of the invasion of Grenada. In a letter to campus Republican leaders, Abramoff claimed:

Citizens for America
In 1985, Abramoff joined Citizens for America, a pro-Reagan group that helped Oliver North build support for the Nicaraguan Contras. Citizens for America staged an unprecedented meeting of anti-Communist rebel leaders known as the Democratic International in Jamba, Angola. This conference included leaders of the Mujahedeen from Afghanistan, UNITA from Angola, the Contras, and opposition groups from Laos. Out of this largely ceremonial conference came the International Freedom Foundation. Abramoff helped to organize, and also attended the conference.

Abramoff's membership ended on a sour note when Citizens for America's sponsor Lewis Lehrman, a former New York gubernatorial candidate, concluded that Abramoff had spent his money carelessly.

In 1986, Reagan appointed Abramoff as a member of the United States Holocaust Memorial Council.

Work in film production, and South Africa connections
Abramoff spent 10 years in Hollywood. He developed (wrote the story) and produced, with his brother Robert, the 1989 film Red Scorpion. The film ultimately cost $16 million (from an $8 million initial budget) and starred Dolph Lundgren playing the Spetsnaz Soviet commando Nikolai, sent by the USSR to assassinate an African revolutionary in a country similar to Angola. Nikolai sees the evil of the Soviets and changes sides, becoming a freedom fighter for the African side. Abramoff also executive-produced its 1994 sequel Red Scorpion 2.

The South African government financed the film via the International Freedom Foundation, a front-group chaired by Abramoff, as part of its efforts to undermine international sympathy for the African National Congress.
The filming location was in South-West Africa (now Namibia).

On April 27, 1998, Abramoff wrote a letter to the editor of The Seattle Times rebutting an article critical of him and his alleged role as effectively a Public Relations puppet of the then-apartheid South African military. Abramoff rebutted:

The IFF was a conservative group which I headed. It was vigorously anti-Communist, but it was also actively anti-apartheid. In 1987, it was one of the first conservative groups to call for the release of Nelson Mandela, a position for which it was roundly criticized by other conservatives at the time. While I headed the IFF, we accepted funding only from private individuals and corporations and would have absolutely rejected any offer of South African military funding, or any other kind of funding from any government – good or evil.

During this period in South Africa, Abramoff first met South African-born rabbi David Lapin, who would become his religious advisor. He also met Lapin's brother and fellow rabbi Daniel Lapin, who allegedly introduced Abramoff to Congressman Tom DeLay (R-TX) at a Washington, DC dinner shortly after the Republican takeover of Congress in 1994. Lapin later claimed that he did not recall making that introduction.

Seattle-based lobbying
In December 1994, Abramoff was hired as a lobbyist at Preston Gates Ellis & Rouvelas Meeds LLP, the lobbying arm of the law firm Preston Gates & Ellis LLP based in Seattle, Washington. According to The Seattle Times, following the Republican takeover of Congress in 1995, partner Emanuel Rouvelas determined that the firm "didn't have a conservative, Christian Coalition Republican with strong ties to the new Republican leadership". The traditionally Democratic-leaning firm hired Abramoff for the specific purpose of attaining these wanted ties.  Abramoff was described in a press release as having close ties to Newt Gingrich and Dick Armey, the former the Republican Speaker of the House and the latter the Republican House Majority Leader.

According to The Seattle Times, Abramoff used Preston Gates & Ellis to access a higher pedigree of clientele.

Choctaw gambling
In 1995, Abramoff began representing Native American tribes with gambling interests. He became involved with the Mississippi Band of Choctaw, a federally recognized tribe. One of Abramoff's first acts as a tribal gaming lobbyist was to defeat a Congressional bill to tax Native American casinos, sponsored by Bill Archer (R-TX) and Ernest Istook (R-OK). According to Washington Business Forward, a lobbying trade magazine, "Tom DeLay was a major factor in those victories, and the fight helped cement the alliance between the two men". DeLay has called Abramoff "one of (his) closest and dearest friends".

The Washington Post, on December 29, 2005, reported: "Jack Abramoff liked to slip into dialogue from The Godfather as he led his lobbying colleagues in planning their next conquest on Capitol Hill. In a favorite bit, he would mimic an ice-cold Michael Corleone facing down a crooked politician's demand for a cut of Mafia gambling profits: 'Senator, you can have my answer now if you like. My offer is this: nothing.'"

Salon.com political writer Thomas Frank considers Abramoff to have acted as a con man. Alex Gibney, director and writer of the 2010 documentary film
Casino Jack and the United States of Money, elaborated on Abramoff's criminal modus operandi. Gibney said, "one of his (Abramoff's) great gifts was being able to tell people what they wanted to hear, and this was how he was able to sell things and get them into trouble." He was interviewed with former U.S. Representative Bob Ney and former Greenberg Traurig lobbyist Neil Volz on Kojo Nnamdi's National Public Radio affiliate WAMU-FM radio show.

Saipan and Northern Mariana Islands

Abramoff and his law firm were paid at least $6.7 million by the Commonwealth of the Northern Mariana Islands (CNMI) from 1995 to 2001. It made manufactured goods labeled with "Made in the USA", but it was not subject to U.S. labor and minimum wage laws. After Abramoff paid for DeLay and his staffers to go on trips to the CNMI, they crafted policy that extended exemptions from federal immigration and labor laws to the islands' industries. Abramoff also negotiated with the Marianas for a $1.2 million no-bid contract for "promoting ethics in government" to be awarded to David Lapin, brother of his associate Daniel Lapin.

Abramoff secretly funded a trip to the Marianas for Congressmen James E. Clyburn (D-SC) and Bennie Thompson (D-MS). In 1999 Congressman Dana Rohrabacher (R-CA) went on an Abramoff-funded trip to the Marshall Islands with John Doolittle (R-CA) and Ken Calvert (R-CA); delegates of Guam, American Samoa, and the Virgin Islands; and eight staffers.

Documentation indicates that Abramoff's lobbying team helped prepare Rep. Ralph Hall's (R-TX) statements on the House floor in which he attacked the credibility of escaped teenaged sex worker "Katrina", in an attempt to discredit her testimony regarding the state of the sex slave industry in the Marianas. Ms. magazine reported Abramoff's dealings in the CNMI and the plight of garment workers like Katrina in a major article published in their spring 2006 issue.

Abramoff arranged for mailings from a Ralph Reed marketing company to Christian conservative voters. He bribed Roger Stillwell, a high-ranking political appointee at the Department of the Interior who was responsible for some Native American gaming policy; Stillwell pleaded guilty in 2006 to accepting gifts from Abramoff. All government officials and employees are prohibited from accepting gifts from consultants, businesses and lobbyists.

Naftasib
Executives of Naftasib, a Russian energy company, funneled almost $3.4 million to Abramoff and DeLay advisor Ed Buckham between 1997 and 2005. About $60,000 was spent on a trip to Russia in 1997 for Tom DeLay, Buckham, and Abramoff. In 1998, $1 million was sent to Buckham via his organization U.S. Family Network to "influence DeLay's vote in 1998 on legislation that helped make it possible for the International Monetary Fund to bail out the faltering Russian economy". DeLay voted for the legislation. The money was funneled through the Dutch company Voor Huisen, the Bahamas company Chelsea Enterprises, and the London law firm James & Sarch Co.

The executives involved, who met DeLay during the 1997 trip, were Marina Nevskaya and Alexander Koulakovsky. Nevskaya was also involved in Abramoff's support of an Israeli military academy, as indicated by an email sent to Abramoff.

eLottery, Inc.

In 1999, eLottery hired Abramoff to block the Internet Gambling Prohibition Act, which he did by enlisting Ralph Reed, Norquist, and Tom DeLay's former chief of staff, Tony Rudy.

Emails from 2000 show that Susan Ralston helped Abramoff pass checks from eLottery to Lou Sheldon's Traditional Values Coalition (TVC) and also to Norquist's Americans for Tax Reform (ATR), en route to Ralph Reed's company, Century Strategies.

Abramoff joins Greenberg Traurig

On January 8, 2001, Abramoff left Preston Gates to join the Government Relations division of the Washington, D.C. law firm Greenberg Traurig, which once described him as "directly involved in the Republican party and conservative movement leadership structures" and "one of the leading fund raisers for the party and its congressional candidates". With the move to Greenberg Traurig, Abramoff took as much as $6 million worth of client business from his old firm, including the Marianas Islands account. At Greenberg Traurig, Abramoff recruited a team of lobbyists known familiarly as "Team Abramoff". The team included many of his former employees from Preston Gates and former senior staffers of members of Congress.

Tribal lobbying

Around the time he joined Greenberg Traurig, Abramoff's choice of lobbying clients changed to focus much more on Native American tribes. While Abramoff was a registered lobbyist for 51 clients while working at Preston Gates, with only four being tribes, Abramoff would eventually represent 24 clients for whom he was registered lobbyist at Greenberg Traurig, of which seven were tribes.

Tyco International Ltd.
Former White House Deputy Counsel Timothy Flanigan left his job in December 2002 to work as General Counsel for Corporate and International Law at Tyco International. He immediately hired Abramoff to lobby Congress and the White House on matters relating to Tyco's Bermuda tax-exempt status. Flanigan stated to the Senate Judiciary Committee that Abramoff "bragged" that he could help Tyco avoid tax liability aimed at offshore companies because he "had good relationships with members of Congress".

Tyco Inc. claimed in August 2005 that Abramoff had been paid $1.7 million for "astroturfing", or the creation of a fake "grassroots" campaign to oppose proposals to penalize US corporations registered abroad for tax reasons. The work allegedly was never performed, and most of the fee Tyco paid Abramoff to lobby against the legislation was "diverted to entities controlled by Mr. Abramoff".

Lobbying for national governments
Abramoff's team represented the government of Malaysia, and worked toward improving Malaysian relations with the United States, particularly with trade relations.

Abramoff also met with the government of Sudan, offering a plan to deflect criticism from American Christian groups over the regime's alleged role in the Darfur conflict. Abramoff promised to enlist Reed to assist, as well as starting a grassroots campaign to improve the image of Sudan in America.

Channel One News
Abramoff was a lobbyist for the school TV news service Channel One News. From 1999 to 2003, Channel One retained him to ensure Congress did not block funds to their service. Not only did Channel One face frequent campaigns by political groups to persuade Congress to limit its presence in schools, but it also derived much of its advertising revenue from U.S. government sources, including the Office of National Drug Control Policy and military recruitment. Since Abramoff and Channel One parted ways, Channel One's advertising revenues have dropped substantially, but a cause-and-effect relationship would be difficult to establish.

Telecommunications firm
On October 18, 2005, The Washington Post reported that Bob Ney, as chair of the House Administration Committee, approved a 2002 license for an Israeli telecommunications company to install antennas for the House of Representatives. The company, then Foxcom Wireless, an Israeli start-up telecommunications firm, (which has since moved headquarters from Jerusalem to Vienna, Virginia, and been renamed MobileAccess Networks) later paid Abramoff $280,000 for lobbying. It also donated $50,000 to the Capital Athletic Foundation charity that Abramoff sometimes used to secretly pay for some of his lobbying activities. In Michael Scanlon's plea agreement, this activity was described as public corruption.

Skyboxes, "Signatures", and Scotland

Abramoff maintained four skyboxes at major sports arenas for political entertaining at a cost of over $1 million a year. Abramoff hosted many fundraisers at these skyboxes including events for politicians publicly opposed to gambling, such as Representative John Doolittle (R-CA).

Then Senate Finance Committee Ranking Member Max Baucus returned $18,892 in contributions that his office found to be connected to Abramoff.  Included in the returned donations was an estimated $1,892 that was never reported for Baucus' use of Abramoff's skybox at a professional sports arena and concert venue in downtown Washington in 2001.

Abramoff also was co-owner of Signatures Restaurant, a high-end Washington establishment which he used to reward friends and associates. His fellow lobbyist Kevin A. Ring treated Justice Department official Robert E. Coughlin to free tickets to the skyboxes and took him out to Signatures multiple times in exchange for favors.
The restaurant, once thriving, was closed once investigations closed in on Abramoff.

DeLay, Ney and Florida Republican Representative Tom Feeney have each gone on golf trips to Scotland that were apparently arranged or funded by Abramoff. These trips took place in 2000, 2002 and 2003. Ney and Feeney each claimed that their trips were paid for by the National Center for Public Policy Research, but the group denied this. Spokespeople for Ney and Feeney blamed others for filing errors. Ney later pleaded guilty to knowing that Abramoff had paid for the trip.

A former top procurement official in the Bush administration, David H. Safavian, has been convicted of lying and obstruction of justice in connection with the Abramoff investigation. Safavian, who traveled to Scotland with Reed and Ney on a golf outing arranged by Abramoff, was accused of concealing from federal investigators information about Abramoff's plans to do business with the General Services Administration at the time of the golf trip – in particular, seeking help finding property for his private religious school, Eshkol Academy, and for one of his tribal clients. Safavian was then GSA chief of staff. However, this conviction was overturned on appeal.

Access to the Bush administration
Jack Abramoff was a highly influential figure as lobbyist and activist in the Bush administration. In 2001, Abramoff was a member of the Bush administration's 2001 Transition Advisory Team assigned to the Department of the Interior. Abramoff befriended the incoming Deputy Secretary of the Interior J. Steven Griles.

The draft report of the House Government Reform Committee said the documents – largely Abramoff's billing records and e-mails – listed 485 lobbying contacts with White House officials over three years, including 10 with top Bush aide Karl Rove. The report said that of the 485 contacts listed, 345 were described as meetings or other in-person contacts; 71 were described as phone conversations and 69 were e-mail exchanges.

In the first ten months of 2001, the Abramoff lobbying team logged almost 200 contacts with the Bush administration. He may have used these senior level contacts to assist in his lobbying for Indian tribes concerning tribal gaming. The Department of the Interior has Federal regulatory authority over tribal affairs such as tribal recognition and gaming. From 2000 to 2003, six Indian tribes paid Abramoff over $80 million in lobbying fees.

The Department of the Interior Office of Insular Affairs has authority over policy and grants to US territories such as the Commonwealth of the Northern Mariana Islands (CNMI).  This may have assisted Abramoff in lobbying for textile interests in the islands. U.S. Senator Conrad Burns (R-MT) and DeLay also heavily lobbied the CNMI for opposing the minimum wage.

Abramoff asked for $9 million in 2003 from the president of Gabon, Omar Bongo, to arrange a meeting with Bush and directed his fees to an Abramoff-controlled lobbying firm, GrassRoots Interactive. Bongo did meet with Bush in the Oval Office on May 26, 2004. There has been no evidence in the public record that Abramoff had any role in organizing the meeting, or that he received any money or had a signed contract with Gabon.

White House and State Department officials described Bush's meeting with Bongo, whose government is regularly accused by the United States of human rights abuses, as routine. The officials said they knew of no involvement by Abramoff in the arrangements. Officials at Gabon's embassy in Washington did not respond to written questions.

Susan Ralston, Rove's assistant since 2001, previously worked as an administrative assistant for both Abramoff and Reed.

According to former Malaysian Prime Minister Mahathir Mohamad, Abramoff was paid $1.2 million to arrange a meeting between Mahathir and Bush, allegedly at the direction of The Heritage Foundation. Mahathir insisted that someone unknown to him had paid for the meeting.

On May 9, 2001, Chief Raul Garza of the Kickapoo tribe of Texas met with Bush, with Abramoff and Norquist in attendance. Abramoff was identified in the background of a photo taken at the meeting. Days before the meeting, the tribe paid $25,000 to Norquist's Americans for Tax Reform at Abramoff's direction. According to the organization's communications director, John Kartch, the meeting was one of several gatherings with Bush sponsored by ATR. On the same day, the chief of the Louisiana Coushattas also attended an ATR-sponsored gathering with Bush. The Coushattas also gave $25,000 to ATR soon before the event.

The details of the Kickapoo meeting and a letter dated May 10, 2001, from ATR thanking the Kickapoos for their contribution were revealed to the New York Times in 2006 by former council elder Isidro Garza, who with Raul Garza (no relation), is under indictment in Texas for embezzling tribal money. According to Isidro Garza, Abramoff did not say the donation was required to meet Bush; the White House denied any knowledge of the transaction.

Other photos have surfaced of Abramoff and Bush meeting at the White House and Oval Office on either December 22 or 23, 2002. The photos were found on a site that published many pictures of governmental events, ReflectionsOrders.com. The owner of the site removed the photos almost immediately when the presence of Abramoff and Bush together was discovered. Some Internet users located the photos and preserved copies of some of them. The owner of the site gave thousands of dollars to the Bush campaign and Republican National Committee, according to public FEC contribution records.

An NPR news report from March 2006 stated that: "... Abramoff recently granted a rare press interview to Vanity Fair magazine, where he asserts President Bush and other prominent figures in Washington know him very well. He called them liars for denying contact with him".

In June 2006, Abramoff began secretly granting exclusive interviews to former Boston Globe investigative reporter Gary S. Chafetz, without the knowledge of Abramoff's attorneys or the federal prosecutors with whom Abramoff had been cooperating. These interviews – conducted before and during Abramoff's imprisonment – continued until May 2008. In September 2008, Chafetz's book, The Perfect Villain: John McCain and the Demonization of Lobbyist Jack Abramoff was rushed into print prior to the 2008 presidential election. In his book, Chafetz asserted that Abramoff, though guilty of some of the charges, was the victim of misleading and sensational reporting by the Washington Post, vengeance and mendacity on the part of Sen. John McCain (R-AZ), and strong-arm tactics of the Justice Department who forced Abramoff into confessing to crimes he did not believe he was guilty of. Chafetz also accused federal prosecutors of abusive – and possibly illegal – tactics in their reliance on private and public honest services fraud, which he characterized as vague and controversial.

Abramoff organizations

Abramoff has founded or run several non-profit organizations, including Capital Athletic Foundation and Eshkol Academy; as well as lobbying firms and political think tanks such as American International Center, GrassRoots Interactive, and the National Center for Public Policy Research. While these organizations had varying degrees of legitimate activities, it has come to light that Abramoff used these organizations to channel millions of dollars to recipients not related to the organizations.

Capital Athletic Foundation and Eshkol Academy

Although Federal tax records show that various Indian tribes donated more than $6 million to the Capital Athletic Foundation, less than 1% of the money went to athletic programs, the stated purpose of the foundation. The majority of the funds went to the Eshkol Academy in Maryland, an Orthodox Jewish school founded by Abramoff in 2002. Hundreds of thousands of dollars from CAF were also spent on golf trips to Scotland for Abramoff, Ney, Ralph Reed Safavian, as well as purchases of camping equipment sent to a high school friend. Abramoff solicited Safavian's help in looking for property deals for Eshkol Academy and tribal clients, leading to Safavian's conviction.

GrassRoots Interactive and Kay Gold

GrassRoots Interactive, now defunct, was a small Silver Spring, Maryland, lobbying firm controlled by Abramoff and PJ Johnson. Millions of dollars flowed into GrassRoots Interactive in 2003, the year it was created, and then flowed out again to unusual places. At least $2.3 million went to a California consulting firm that used the same address as the law office of Abramoff's brother, Robert. A separate check for $400,000, from GrassRoots, was made out to Kay Gold LLC, another Abramoff family company.

Maldon Institute
Abramoff was a board member and secretary/treasurer of the Maldon Institute for at least five years (1999–2003). He was one of only four board members, including PJ Johnson and John Rees.

Scandal and criminal investigations
In late 2004, the Senate Indian Affairs Committee began to investigate Abramoff's lobbying on behalf of American Indian tribes and casinos. In September he was called before the Committee to answer questions about that work, but pleaded the fifth.

SunCruz Casinos fraud conviction

On August 11, 2005, Abramoff and Adam Kidan were indicted by a federal grand jury in Fort Lauderdale, Florida, on fraud charges arising from a 2000 deal to buy SunCruz Casinos from Gus Boulis. Abramoff and Kidan are accused of using a fake wire transfer to make lenders believe that they had made a $23 million down payment, in order to qualify for a $60 million loan. Ney also was implicated in helping to consummate the deal.

After the partners purchased SunCruz in September 2000, the business relationship with Boulis deteriorated, culminating in a fistfight between Kidan and Boulis in December 2000. In February 2001 Boulis was murdered in his car in a Mafia-style attack. The murder investigation included three individuals who had received payments from Kidan. Two of the suspects received life sentences for the murder charges, while a third associate pled guilty to conspiracy to commit murder and was sentenced to 6 and half years time served already after he testified against his co-conspirators.

On January 4, 2006, Abramoff pleaded guilty to conspiracy and wire fraud in Miami, related to the SunCruz deal. The plea agreement called for a maximum sentence of just over seven years and would run concurrently with the sentence in the Washington corruption case, but could be reduced if Abramoff cooperated fully. The remaining four counts in the Florida indictment were dismissed.

On March 29, 2006, Abramoff and Kidan were both sentenced in the SunCruz case to the minimum amount of 70 months, and ordered to pay US$21.7 million in restitution. According to the "memorandum in aid of sentencing", the sentencing judge, U.S. District Judge Paul C. Huck, received over 260 pleas for leniency from various people, including "rabbis, military officers and even a professional hockey referee."

Guam grand jury investigation

In 2002 Abramoff was retained under a secret contract by the Guam Superior Court to lobby against a bill proposing to put the Superior Court under the authority of the Guam Supreme Court. On November 18, 2002, a grand jury issued a subpoena demanding that the administrator of the Guam Superior Court release all records relating to the contract. On November 19, 2002, U.S. Attorney Frederick A. Black, the chief prosecutor for Guam and the instigator of the indictment, was unexpectedly demoted and removed from the office he had held since 1991. The federal grand jury investigation was quickly wound down and took no further action. In 2005 Public Auditor Doris Flores Brooks initiated a new investigation of the Abramoff contract, which is continuing.

In 2006 California attorney and Marshall Islands lobbyist Howard Hills, and Tony Sanchez, a former administrator of the Guam Superior Court, were indicted for unlawful influence, conspiracy for unlawful influence, theft of property held in trust, and official misconduct for allegedly authorizing 36 payments of $9,000 vis a vis a pre-existing contract between Hills and the Guam Superior Court, each written out to Hills, but funneled to Abramoff. Hills, trusting Sanchez as a court official at face value, assumed that this was a temporary circumstance and agreed to help facilitate transition for what he thought was a standard government contract between Abramoff and the court. For this Hills received no compensation. Before indictments or investigations were initiated, Hills halted his temporary contract with Abramoff and reported what he thought was potentially suspicious behavior to public officials when it occurred to him that something may be wrong. In 2007, superseding indictments were issued against Hills and Sanchez, and in 2008 further related indictments were handed down against Abramoff and Abramoff's firm at the time, Greenberg Traurig. The charges against both attorney Howard Hills and Greenberg Traurig have since been dismissed.

Native tribes grand jury investigations

Abramoff and his partner, Michael Scanlon (a former Tom DeLay aide), conspired to bilk Native casino gambling interests out of an estimated $85 million in fees. The lobbyists also orchestrated lobbying against their own clients in order to force them to pay for lobbying services. These practices were the subject both of long-running criminal prosecution and hearings by the Senate Indian Affairs Committee. On November 21, 2005, Scanlon pleaded guilty to conspiring to bribe a member of Congress and other public officials.

On January 3, 2006, Abramoff pleaded guilty to three felony counts – conspiracy, fraud, and tax evasion – involving charges stemming principally from his lobbying activities in Washington on behalf of Native American tribes. The four tribes Abramoff and his associates had been involved with included Michigan's Saginaw Chippewas, California's Agua Caliente, the Mississippi Choctaws, and the Louisiana Coushattas.
As a result, Abramoff and other defendants must make restitution of at least $25 million that was defrauded from clients, primarily the Native American tribes. Further, Abramoff owes the Internal Revenue Service $1.7 million as a result of his guilty plea to the tax evasion charge. In the agreement, Abramoff admits to bribing public officials, including Ney.  Also included: the hiring of congressional staffers and conspiring with them to lobby their former employers – including members of Congress – in violation of a one-year federal ban on such lobbying.

Later in 2006 Abramoff lobbyists Neil Volz and Tony Rudy pleaded guilty to conspiracy charges; in September 2006 Ney himself pleaded guilty to conspiracy and making false statements.

On September 4, 2008, a Washington court found Abramoff guilty of trading expensive gifts, meals and sports trips in exchange for political favors, and U.S. District Judge Ellen Segal Huvelle sentenced him to a four-year term in prison, to be served concurrently with his previous sentences. Abramoff cooperated in a bribery investigation involving lawmakers, their aides, and members of the Bush administration.

People convicted in Abramoff probe
Eventually 24 people were convicted of corruption or bribery.
 Adam Kidan (an Abramoff associate), was sentenced in Florida in March 2006, serving 27 months in prison, followed by three years of probation.
 Todd Boulanger, an Abramoff deputy, pleaded guilty to lavishing congressional aides with meals, gifts  and tickets to sporting events, concerts, and the circus in exchange for help with legislation favorable to Abramoff's clients. Sentenced to 30 days and fined.
 Roger Stillwell (R) Staff in the Department of the Interior under George W. Bush(R). Pleaded guilty and received two years suspended sentence for not reporting hundreds of dollars' worth of sports and concert tickets he received from Abramoff.
 Steven Griles (R) (former Deputy Interior Secretary) the highest-ranking Bush administration official convicted in the scandal, pleaded guilty to obstruction of justice. He admitted lying to a Senate committee about his relationship with Abramoff, who repeatedly sought Griles' intervention at Interior on behalf of Indian tribal clients.
 David Safavian (R) (former White House official), the Bush administration's former top procurement official, was sentenced to 18 months in prison in October 2006 after he was found guilty of covering up his dealings with Abramoff.
 Bob Ney (R-OH) then U. S. Representative, pleaded guilty September 2006, sentenced in January 2007 to 2½ years in prison, acknowledged taking bribes from Abramoff. Ney was in the traveling party on an Abramoff-sponsored golf trip to Scotland at the heart of the case against Safavian.
Neil Volz (R) a former chief of staff to Ney who left government to work for Abramoff, pleaded guilty in May 2006 to conspiring to corrupt Ney and others with trips and other aid
William Heaton (R) former chief of staff for Ney, pleaded guilty to a federal conspiracy charge involving a golf trip to Scotland, expensive meals, and tickets to sporting events between 2002 and 2004 as payoffs for helping Abramoff's clients.
Thomas Hart (R) former chief of staff for Ney, pleaded guilty to a federal conspiracy charge involving a golf trip to Scotland, expensive meals, and tickets to sporting events between 2002 and 2004 as payoffs for helping Abramoff's clients.
 Italia Federici (R) co-founder of the Council of Republicans for Environmental Advocacy, pleaded guilty to tax evasion and obstruction of a Senate investigation into Abramoff's relationship with officials at the Department of the Interior.
 Jared Carpenter (R) Vice-President of the Council of Republicans for Environmental Advocacy, was discovered during the Abramoff investigation and pleaded guilty to income tax evasion. He got 45 days, plus 4 years probation.
 Mark Zachares (R) former aide to U. S. Representative Don Young(R-AL), pleaded guilty to conspiracy. He acknowledged accepting tens of thousands of dollars' worth of gifts and a golf trip to Scotland from Abramoff's team in exchange for official acts on the lobbyist's behalf.
 Kevin A. Ring (R) former staff to John Doolittle (R-CA) was convicted of five charges of corruption. He was sentenced to 20 months in prison in October 2011.
James Hirni (R) US Senate aide, acknowledged bribing Trevor L. Blackann (R) aide to US Senator Kit Bond (R) with meals, concert passes and tickets to the opening game of the 2003 World Series between the Florida Marlins and the New York Yankees at Yankee Stadium, pleaded guilty to using wire communications to defraud taxpayers of congressional aides' honest services.
Trevor L. Blackann (R) a former aide to US Senator Kit Bond (R-MO) and then-US Rep. Roy Blunt (R-MO), pleaded guilty to not reporting $4,100 in gifts from lobbyists in return for helping clients of Abramoff and his associates. Among the gifts were tickets to the World Series and concerts, plus meals and entertainment at a "gentleman's club."
Michael Scanlon (R) a former Staff member of Tom DeLay, pled guilty to committing bribery in the course of his work for Abramoff.
Tony Rudy (R) another former staff member of Tom DeLay, he also left DeLay to work with Abramoff; pleaded guilty to conspiracy.
 John Albaugh (R) former Chief of Staff to Ernest Istook (R-OK), pleaded guilty to accepting bribes connected to the Federal Highway Bill. Istook was not charged. (2008)
 Robert E. Coughlin (R) Deputy Chief of Staff, Criminal Division of the Justice Department pleaded guilty to conflict of interest after accepting bribes from Jack Abramoff. (2008)
 Horace Cooper (R) a former Labor Department official with the Bush administration and aide to US Rep. Dick Armey (R-TX), pleaded guilty to falsifying a document when he did not report receiving gifts from Abramoff.
 Ann Copland (R) a former aide to US Senator Thad Cochran (R-MS) pleaded guilty to taking more than $25,000 worth of concert and sporting event tickets in return for helping Abramoff.
Roger Stillwell, a former Interior Department official, was sentenced to two years on probation in January 2007 after pleading guilty to a misdemeanor charge for not reporting hundreds of dollars worth of sports and concert tickets he received from Abramoff.
 Fraser Verrusio (R) former Transportation Dept official, was found guilty of conspiracy and accepting bribes. Sentenced to 1 day in jail, 2 years' probation and a $1,000 fine.

Incarceration
Abramoff served four years of a six-year sentence. On November 15, 2006, he began serving his term in the minimum security prison camp of Federal Correctional Institution, Cumberland, Maryland, as inmate number 27593-112. The Justice Department had requested that he serve his sentence there so as to be accessible to agents in Washington for cooperation as the investigations related to his associates intensified. Abramoff worked as a clerk in the prison chaplain's office for 12 cents an hour. He was also teaching courses in public speaking and screenwriting to his fellow inmates and instituted a popular movie night.

Post-release activities

On June 8, 2010, he was released from federal prison and was transferred to a halfway house in Baltimore, Maryland, until the end of his six-year sentence. In late June he began working as an accountant at the kosher pizzeria Tov Pizza, working about 40 hours a week from 10:30 a.m. till 5:30 p.m., earning between $7.50 and $10.00 per hour. He finished working at Tov Pizza when he was released from the halfway house on December 3, 2010.

Abramoff has returned to lobbying since his release from prison, having attempted to arrange meetings between then President-elect Donald Trump and foreign leaders. He is registered as a lobbyist.

On June 25, 2020, Abramoff and CEO Roland Marcus Andrade were charged in San Francisco federal court with fraud in connection with a $5 million cryptocurrency deal.  Abramoff agreed to a negotiated plea of guilty. On July 14, 2020, Abramoff pleaded guilty to charges of conspiracy and violating the Lobbying Disclosure Act in relation to the AML BitCoin case. Abramoff faces up to five years in prison for each count. Notably, this makes Abramoff the first person to be convicted under the Lobbying Disclosure Act, which was amended as a result of his previous misconduct.

Criticism of lobbying industry

In November 2011, the book Capitol Punishment: The Hard Truth About Washington Corruption From America's Most Notorious Lobbyist Abramoff wrote after he was released from prison was published. The 300-page memoir is an account of his life in Washington as a lobbyist. In its last chapter, titled "Path to Reform", Abramoff portrays himself as someone who supports genuine reform and lists a number of proposals to eliminate bribery of government officials, such as barring members of Congress and their aides for life from becoming lobbyists.

Abramoff has become a critic of the lobbying industry and has appeared on radio and television, "trying ... to redeem and rebrand himself". He has a Facebook page and game app called "Congressional Jack", and a feature film in the works about the lobbying milieu. He plans to charge for giving talks about corruption in Washington, and has briefed F.B.I. agents on the nature of corruption. He has joined the United Republic anticorruption nonprofit organization and has started in February 2012 as one of the lead bloggers at United Republic's newly launched , described as "an anti-corruption blog focusing on how self-interested dollars are warping the public-interest responsibilities of America's democratic institutions" by the Huffington Post.

He has appeared as a guest on CNN to talk about lobbying and the Affordable Care Act healthcare reform law. In July 2012, Premier Networks announced it was launching "The Jack Abramoff Show" on XM Satellite Radio's "Talk Radio" channel, on which Abramoff would hold forth on political reform.

Following Abramoff's return to lobbying after his time in prison, lawmakers passed the Justice Against Corruption on K Street (JACK) Act, which requires convicts such as Abramoff to disclose their criminal history when they re-register to lobby.

In June 2020, Jack Abramoff entered guilty pleas on charges of criminal conspiracy and failing to adhere to the JACK Act.

Personal life
Abramoff has been married to Pamela Clarke Abramoff (née Alexander), a co-manager and executive assistant at Capital Athletic Foundation, since July 1986. The couple has five children. Pamela is a convert to Orthodox Judaism.

See also
 :Category:Jack Abramoff scandals
 List of federal political scandals in the United States

References

External links

 Official website
 
 Posts by Jack Abramoff at Republic Report
 

1959 births
Living people
Beverly Hills High School alumni
Businesspeople from California
American film producers
American Orthodox Jews
American lobbyists
American people convicted of tax crimes
Brandeis University alumni
College Republican National Committee chairs
Georgetown University Law Center alumni
Jewish American writers
People from Atlantic City, New Jersey
People from Beverly Hills, California
Lawyers from Washington, D.C.
People convicted of honest services fraud
21st-century American criminals
20th-century American criminals
California Republicans
Washington (state) Republicans
People associated with Greenberg Traurig
Jewish anti-communists